Victor da Silva (or Victor Da Silva) is a name. People with that name include:

 Victor Da Silva (footballer, born 1962), Portuguese football midfielder
 Victor da Silva (footballer, born 1976), Brazilian football midfielder
 Victor da Silva (footballer, born 1995), Brazilian football attacking midfielder

See also
 Vitinho (footballer, born 1989), full name Victor da Silva Medeiros, known as Vitinho, Brazilian football striker

da Silva, Victor